The three teams in this group played against each other on a home-and-away basis. France and Bulgaria finished level on points and advanced to a play-off on neutral ground to decide who would qualify. The winner (Bulgaria) qualified for the 1962 FIFA World Cup held in Chile.

Standings

Matches

 

 

 

 

 

Bulgaria and France finished level on points, and a play-off on neutral ground was played to decide who would qualify.

References

External links
 FIFA official page
 RSSSF – 1962 World Cup Qualification
 Allworldcup

2
1960 in Finnish football
1961 in Finnish football
1960–61 in Bulgarian football
qual
1960–61 in French football
qual